Tshilidzi Nephawe (born 10 June 1989) is a South African professional basketball player for the Niigata Albirex BB of the Japanese B.League.

Nephawe attended Mphaphuli Secondary School near Thohoyandou and played for Limpopo‘s provincial teams at a young age. He went on to New Mexico State University, where he was a teammate of future NBA player Pascal Siakam.

References

External links
 Afrobasket.com profile
 ESPN profile
 New Mexico State bio
New Mexico State Aggies bio

1989 births
Living people
Bambitious Nara players
Centers (basketball)
Fukushima Firebonds players
Kumamoto Volters players
New Mexico State Aggies men's basketball players
Sendai 89ers players
South African men's basketball players
Sportspeople from Johannesburg